Neotelphusa obliquifascia is a moth of the family Gelechiidae. It is found in Mozambique.

References

Moths described in 1960
Neotelphusa